Volanen is a Finnish surname. Notable people with the surname include:

Eeva-Kaarina Volanen (1921–1999), Finnish actress
Jani Volanen (born 1971), Finnish actor, writer, and director

Finnish-language surnames